The 1995 RCA Championships was a tennis tournament played on outdoor hard courts. It was the 8th edition of the event known that year as the RCA Championships, and was part of the Championship Series of the 1995 ATP Tour. It took place at the Indianapolis Tennis Center in Indianapolis, Indiana, United States, from July 14 through July 20, 1995.

The singles field was led by ATP No. 2, Australian Open runner-up, Wimbledon champion and two-time Indianapolis titlist Pete Sampras, Wimbledon semifinalist and Hamburg finalist Goran Ivanišević, and Dubai and Munich champion Wayne Ferreira. Other top seeds were Auckland, Philadelphia and Pinehurst winner Thomas Enqvist, Adelaide, Scottsdale and Tokyo champion Jim Courier, Todd Martin, Alberto Berasategui and Andrei Medvedev.

Finals

Singles

 Thomas Enqvist defeated  Bernd Karbacher, 6–4, 6–3
It was Thomas Enqvist's 4th title of the year, and his 6th overall.

Doubles

 Mark Knowles /  Daniel Nestor defeated  Scott Davis /  Todd Martin, 6–4, 6–4

References

External links
 Official website
 ITF tournament edition details

RCA Championships
1995
RCA Championships
RCA Championships
RCA Championships